The 2015 ISF Men's World Championship was an international softball tournament held in Saskatoon, Canada from 26 June-5 July 2015. It was the 14th time the World Championship took place and the third time Saskatoon hosted the tournament.

Participating teams and officials

Qualification

Pools composition

 withdrew from the tournament on June 19 and was not replaced.

Officials
The ISF appointed 16 umpires from 11 national countries to facilitate matches of the tournament. Bob Stanton from Canada is named Umpire in Chief, and Wayne Saunders and Jeff Whippl, from New Zealand and Canada respectively, were named assistant Umpire in Chiefs.

Rosters

Preliminary round

Pool A

|}

Pool B

|}

Championship Round

|}

|}

Placement Round

|}

Final standings

References

External links
Official Website

ISF Men's World Championship
Sports competitions in Saskatoon
Men's Softball World Championship
Men's Softball World Championship
International softball competitions hosted by Canada
Men's Softball World Championship
Men's Softball World Championship
2015 in Saskatchewan